Pizzo d'Orsalietta is a mountain of the Swiss Lepontine Alps, located west of Cevio in the canton of Ticino. It lies between the valleys of Bavona and Bosco/Gurin.

References

External links
 Pizzo d'Orsalietta on Hikr

Mountains of the Alps
Mountains of Switzerland
Mountains of Ticino
Lepontine Alps